Yong-in Songdam College is a private technical college in Yongin City, Gyeonggi province, South Korea.  It employs about 100 instructors.  Most courses of study are related to computers or digital technology.

History
The college was founded in 1995.  Its president was Choi Yeong-cheol (최영철), who continues to serve in that capacity.

Sister schools
Yong-in Songdam maintains international sisterhood relations with three American institutions (Madonna University, the Community Colleges for International Development, Kapiolani Community College), three Russian institutions (the State University of Management, Institute of World Economy and International Relations, Moscow State University of Industrial and Applied Arts), and one Canadian institution (St. Clair College).

See also
List of colleges and universities in South Korea
Education in South Korea

External links
Official school website, in Korean
Official school website, in English

Universities and colleges in Gyeonggi Province
Yongin
Educational institutions established in 1995
1995 establishments in South Korea